X road may refer to :
 Nalgonda 'X' Roads, a major junction in Hyderabad, Andhra Pradesh, India
 Corridor X, the part of Interstate 22 east of Fulton, Mississippi
 X-Road, part of the e-Estonia initiative, developed by Cybernetica (Estonian company)